James Meads (28 October 1877 – 3 November 1957) was an English cricketer. He played three first-class matches for Surrey in 1905. He played as a bowler (right-arm slow).

See also
 List of Surrey County Cricket Club players

References

External links
 

1877 births
1957 deaths
Cricketers from Nottinghamshire
English cricketers
People from Calverton, Nottinghamshire
Surrey cricketers